Denise Calls Up is a 1995 American comedy released by Sony Pictures Classics in 1996.  Written and directed by Hal Salwen, it has an ensemble cast which includes Liev Schreiber, Timothy Daly, and Alanna Ubach. The plot revolves around a group of friends in New York City who, while working at their PCs and laptops and keeping in touch by phone and fax, never seem to be able to get together.

Plot
Linda wakes up one morning to her ringing phone. Her friend, Gale wants to know how her party went last night. To her dismay, Linda tells her that no one showed up, "not a one."  Thus begins Denise Calls Up, the story of seven friends living in New York City who no longer find it necessary to actually meet face to face due to the new age of the internet and wireless phones. But Gale is less upset about the absolute absenteeism, than about the fact that her friend Barbara never got to meet Jerry. Gale has been trying to set them up.  So she calls Barbara, chastising her for not making it to Linda's and goading her into meeting Jerry. After protesting that she's just been too busy, Barbara eventually acquiesces. Meanwhile, Denise, who has gotten pregnant by an anonymous sperm insemination, locates the donor, Martin, and decides to call him. And so it goes, as the characters, via phone and fax, duck and miss each other time after time, using one excuse after the other to avoid meetings, births, and even a funeral until, finally, Frank, determined to finally get everyone together, plans a New Year's Eve party.  All swear that they will be there.

Cast
 Tim Daly as Frank Oliver
 Caroleen Feeney as Barbara Gorton
 Dan Gunther as Martin Weiner
 Dana Wheeler-Nicholson as Gale Donelly
 Liev Schreiber as Jerry Heckerman
 Hal Salwen as young Jerry
 Aida Turturro as Linda
 Alanna Ubach as Denise Devaro
 Sylvia Miles as Sharon, Gale's Aunt
 Jean-Claude La Marre as Dalton Philips, cab driver (as Jean LaMarre)
 Mark Blum as Dr. Brennan, Obstetrician

Reception

Rotten Tomatoes gives the film a 74% "Certified Fresh" rating based on 23 reviews.
Janet Maslin of The New York Times wrote: "Mr. Salwen's storytelling gambit may sound like a stunt, but he does a remarkably agile job of sustaining it throughout a sunny 80-minute comedy."

Awards
 Tied for Jury Prize at the Deauville American Film Festival with The Brothers McMullen.
 Camera d'Or Special Mention at the Cannes Film Festival

References

External links
 Denise Calls Up at Sony Pictures Classics
 
 
 
 

1995 films
American independent films
1995 independent films
1995 comedy films
Films set in New York City
American comedy films
Davis Entertainment films
Films produced by John Davis
Sony Pictures Classics films
1990s English-language films
1990s American films